Alex Kuznetsov was the defending champion, but lost in the first round to Hidalgo.

Nick Kyrgios won the title, defeating Filip Krajinović in the final, 7–6(12–10), 6–4.

Seeds

  Alex Bogomolov Jr. (second round)
  Donald Young (quarterfinals)
  Jack Sock (first round)
  Michael Russell (first round)
  Tim Smyczek (first round)
  Alex Kuznetsov (first round)
  Facundo Bagnis (first round)
  Peter Polansky (second round)

Draw

Finals

Top half

Bottom half

References
 Main draw
 Qualifying draw

2014 ATP Challenger Tour
2014 Singles